Jessie Rodriguez (born July 5, 1977) is a Salvadoran American immigrant and Republican politician.  She is a member of the Wisconsin State Assembly, representing the 21st Assembly district–southeastern Milwaukee County. Currently, she represents the cities of Oak Creek, Franklin, and South Milwaukee. She is the first Hispanic immigrant elected to the Wisconsin Legislature.

Early life and education

Born in El Salvador, Rodriguez moved to the United States in 1984 with her family, eventually settling in Milwaukee.  She graduated from Milwaukee's Alexander Hamilton High School in 1996 and went on to attend Milwaukee's Marquette University where she earned her bachelor's degree in communications.  After graduating college in 2002, Jessie worked as an analyst for a large supermarket chain, but eventually landed a job as a communications outreach coordinator for Hispanics for School Choice.

Political career

On November 19, 2013, Rodriguez became the first Latin American immigrant to be elected to the Wisconsin State Legislature.  She was sworn into the Wisconsin State Assembly on December 4, 2013, as a Republican.  In 2021, Rodriguez was appointed to the Joint Finance Committee, a powerful 16-member budgeting committee overseeing all of the state's appropriations and revenues.

Personal life and family
Rodriguez lives in Oak Creek, Wisconsin, with her husband and son.

Electoral history

References

External links
 
 
 Hispanics for School Choice
 Representative Jessie Rodriguez at Wisconsin Legislature

1977 births
Living people
People from Franklin, Milwaukee County, Wisconsin
People from Usulután Department
Salvadoran emigrants to the United States
American politicians of Salvadoran descent
Marquette University alumni
Women state legislators in Wisconsin
Hispanic and Latino American state legislators in Wisconsin
Hispanic and Latino American women in politics
21st-century American politicians
21st-century American women politicians
Latino conservatism in the United States
Republican Party members of the Wisconsin State Assembly